Dresserus is a genus of African velvet spiders that was first described by Eugène Simon in 1876.

Species
 it contains twenty-four species:
Dresserus aethiopicus Simon, 1909 – Ethiopia
Dresserus angusticeps Purcell, 1904 – South Africa
Dresserus armatus Pocock, 1901 – Uganda
Dresserus bilineatus Tullgren, 1910 – East Africa
Dresserus collinus Pocock, 1900 – South Africa
Dresserus colsoni Tucker, 1920 – South Africa
Dresserus darlingi Pocock, 1900 – South Africa
Dresserus elongatus Tullgren, 1910 – East Africa
Dresserus fontensis Lawrence, 1928 – Namibia
Dresserus fuscus Simon, 1876 (type) – East Africa, Zanzibar
Dresserus kannemeyeri Tucker, 1920 – South Africa
Dresserus laticeps Purcell, 1904 – South Africa
Dresserus murinus Lawrence, 1927 – Namibia
Dresserus namaquensis Purcell, 1908 – South Africa
Dresserus nasivulvus Strand, 1907 – East Africa
Dresserus nigellus Tucker, 1920 – South Africa
Dresserus obscurus Pocock, 1898 – South Africa
Dresserus olivaceus Pocock, 1900 – South Africa
Dresserus rostratus Purcell, 1908 – Namibia
Dresserus schreineri Tucker, 1920 – South Africa
Dresserus schultzei Purcell, 1908 – Namibia
Dresserus sericatus Tucker, 1920 – South Africa
Dresserus subarmatus Tullgren, 1910 – East Africa, Botswana
Dresserus tripartitus Lawrence, 1938 – South Africa

References

Araneomorphae genera
Eresidae
Taxa named by Eugène Simon